This is a list of the number-one hits of 1977 on Italian Hit Parade Singles Chart.

Chart history

Number-one artists

References

1977
1977 in Italian music
1977 record charts